The sexual abuse scandal in Cardiff archdiocese is a significant episode in the series of Catholic sex abuse cases in various Western countries.

John Lloyd affair
In 1998, Father John Lloyd, a parish priest and Bishop John Aloysius Ward's former press secretary, was imprisoned for sexual offences involving children. Parents had written letters to Ward to complain of Lloyd's behaviour: he reportedly passed the letters on to Lloyd. In 1999, Lloyd was laicized by the Pope. Later in 1999, Ward himself was accused of raping a woman with a crucifix on the altar of his parish church in the 1960s. He was arrested, but never charged. The allegations appeared in the press, and Ward made impassioned statements of his innocence, claiming that the allegations were entirely false.

Joseph Jordan affair
In October 2000, Joseph Jordan was imprisoned for indecent assaults on boys, and for downloading child pornography from the Internet. Jordan had been ordained by Ward in 1998, despite Ward being warned about Jordan's behaviour by Christopher Budd, Bishop of Plymouth, under whom Lloyd started his training for the priesthood. A BBC Panorama investigation accused Ward of failing to take action, and he was pressured to resign.

Early episcopal retirement 
Bishop John Aloysius Ward suffered a stroke and then a deep vein thrombosis in November 2000, and went on sick leave, with Bishop of Wrexham Edwin Regan deputising for him. The Catholic Herald defended Ward, but The Tablet called for his retirement. After a period of recuperation, he said he was ready to return to his office. Ward was interviewed by Pope John Paul II, and resigned shortly afterwards, on 26 October 2001. He was replaced as Archbishop by Peter Smith. Ward retired to a bungalow, where he displayed his Archepiscopal coat of arms over his front door.

Posthumous allegations against Ward
According to the Times March 28, 2007 (the day after Archbishop Ward's death):The nightmare had begun in January 1999, when a woman claimed that he [Ward] had raped her with a crucifix on the altar of his London parish church in the 1960s. Her story, deemed improbable by four police stations in Britain and Ireland, was finally accepted by a fifth. The allegation was reported in a tabloid newspaper before the police had even approached the archbishop. He was later arrested, but released without charge.

References

Catholic Church sexual abuse scandals in the United Kingdom
Child sexual abuse in Wales